The Eighth Symphony by the German composer Hans Werner Henze was composed in 1992–93.

Using Shakespeare's A Midsummer Night's Dream as inspiration, it has a lighter theme than the major work it immediately follows, the Requiem of 1992. Each movement is inspired by a short section of the play: the first derives in part from Puck's line "I'll put a girdle round the earth/ In forty minutes". Henze depicts Puck's global journey in pitch variation: the East is middle C, the South Pole is the lowest notes in the modern symphony orchestra's range, while the North Pole is naturally at the opposite end of the range. The second movement depicts Titania's attempted seduction of Bottom, whilst the Adagio final movement takes Puck's If we shadows have offended speech at the end of the play.

It was premiered by the Boston Symphony Orchestra, who commissioned the piece (and to whom Henze dedicated it) under Seiji Ozawa on 1 October 1993.

Movements
 Allegro
 Allegramente con comodo tenerezza e ballabilità
 Adagio

References

8
1993 compositions
Works based on A Midsummer Night's Dream
Music based on works by William Shakespeare
Music commissioned by the Boston Symphony Orchestra